Ranam may refer to:

 Ranam (2006 film), a Telugu film
 Ranam (2018 film), a Malayalam film
 Ranam (2021 film), a Kannada film
 Ranam-guyok, a district of Chongjin, North Korea